Azra Kolaković (1 January 1977 – 2 October 2017), known by her stage name Donna Ares, was a Bosnian pop and pop-folk singer. Her final studio album Povratka nema was released in 2011. She died at age 40 following a three-year long battle with uterine cancer.

Early life
Azra Kolaković was born in the northwestern Bosnian city of Bihać to Bosnian Muslim parents Osman and Ajka. She attended local music schools and graduated in 1995, during the Bosnian War. She started attending a music academy, but stopped due to the ongoing war in the country.

In 1997 she started her solo singing career. She debuted in 1997, under her stage name Donna Ares, to sing in the Croatian Dora competition to represent Croatia in the Eurovision Song Contest.

Illness and death
Kolaković had been fatigued and losing weight for months before being hospitalized in early October 2014. She was diagnosed with uterine cancer

She died at age 40 of the illness in her hometown on 2 October 2017, while in a coma. She was buried two days later next to her father who had died in 2006.

Discography

Studio albums
Ti me više ne voliš (1998)
Čuvaj se dušo, ja sam tatin sin (2002)
Jackpot (2004)
Nemam razloga za strah (2006)
Fantastična (2009)
Povratka nema (2011)

Remix and live albums
Live Mix I (2000)
Live Mix II (2001)
Live Mix III (2003)

Compilation albums
The Best Of Donna Ares (Nemoj da pogađam) (2003)
Mega mix (2003)
Best Of Donna Ares (To mi nije trebalo) (2006)
Deset godina sa vama (Live) (2007)
The Best Of Donna Ares (Želim da te gledam) (2010)

Other works
She is author of her autobiography book entitled Soba za nikoga (lit. 'Room for Nobody'), published in 2015 by Buybook; in the illustrated book, she confession-talks her disease, hospital days and remission recovery.

References

Further reading

External links

2015 interview for Maxmagazin.ba 

1977 births
2017 deaths
People from Bihać
21st-century Bosnia and Herzegovina women singers
Bosnia and Herzegovina folk-pop singers
Hayat Production artists
Grand Production artists
BN Music artists
Bosniaks of Bosnia and Herzegovina
Deaths from uterine cancer
Deaths from cancer in Bosnia and Herzegovina
20th-century Bosnia and Herzegovina women singers